Motherwell was a burgh constituency represented in the House of Commons of the Parliament of the United Kingdom from 1918 to 1974. It was formed by the division of Lanarkshire. The name was changed in 1974 to Motherwell and Wishaw. It is famous for returning the first-ever SNP MP (Robert McIntyre in 1945) and arguably the first Communist Party MP (Walton Newbold in 1922).

Boundaries 
From 1918 the constituency consisted of "The burghs of Motherwell and Wishaw, together with the part of the Middle Ward County District which is contained within the extraburghal portion of the parish of Dalziel."

Members of Parliament

Election results

Elections in the 1970s

Elections in the 1960s

Elections in the 1950s

Elections in the 1940s

Elections in the 1930s

Elections in the 1920s 

 Ferguson was associated with the Grand Orange Lodge of Scotland movement in Lanarkshire.

Elections in the 1910s 

 Ferguson was associated with the Grand Orange Lodge of Scotland movement in Lanarkshire.

References

See also 

Historic parliamentary constituencies in Scotland (Westminster)
Constituencies of the Parliament of the United Kingdom established in 1918
Constituencies of the Parliament of the United Kingdom disestablished in 1974
Motherwell
Politics of North Lanarkshire